The 2002 Clemson Tigers football team represented Clemson University during the 2002 NCAA Division I-A football season.  The season marked the 100th game played between Clemson and South Carolina.

Schedule

Roster

References

Clemson
Clemson Tigers football seasons
Clemson Tigers football